Estee is a feminine given name, a diminutive of the name Esther.

It may refer to:
Estée Cattoor, Belgian footballer
 Estee Shiraz, American-Israeli entrepreneur, communication expert and mediator
Morris M. Estee (1833-1903), American Republican lawyer, politician, and judge from California
Estée Lauder (businesswoman)
Estée Lauder Companies
Estee Portnoy, American businesswoman

See also
Esti (given name)